Brampton is an unincorporated community in Delta County, in the U.S. state of Michigan.

History
A post office was established at Brampton in 1874, and remained in operation until it was discontinued in 1984. The community was named after the town of Brampton, in England.

Climate

References

Unincorporated communities in Delta County, Michigan
Unincorporated communities in Michigan